Felix Manning Jr. (November 14, 1909 – November 1982) was an American Negro league first baseman in the 1930s.

A native of Jefferson County, Alabama, Manning played for the Montgomery Grey Sox in 1932. He went on to manage the Atlanta Black Crackers in 1944, and appeared twice on the mound for Atlanta that season. Manning died in Birmingham, Alabama in 1982 at age 72 or 73.

References

External links
 and Seamheads

1909 births
1982 deaths
Date of death missing
Atlanta Black Crackers players
Montgomery Grey Sox players
Baseball first basemen
Baseball players from Alabama
People from Jefferson County, Alabama